Camptopleura is a genus of skippers in the family Hesperiidae.

Species
Camptopleura auxo (Möschler, 1879) – Auxo skipper
Camptopleura cincta Mabille and Boullet, 1917
Camptopleura janthinus (Capronnier, 1874)
Camptopleura oaxaca Freeman, 1969 – Oaxacan bent-skipper
Camptopleura orsus (Mabille, 1889)
Camptopleura termon (Hopffer, 1874) – Termon skipper
Camptopleura theramenes Mabille, 1877 - Mabille's bentwing

References

Natural History Museum Lepidoptera genus database

Erynnini
Hesperiidae genera
Taxa named by Paul Mabille